is a railway station on the Keio Inokashira Line in Komaba, Meguro, Tokyo, Japan, operated by the private railway operator Keio Corporation.

The station's name is a combination of Komaba, the name of the suburb in which it is located, and Todai-mae - which means "in front of University of Tokyo".

Lines

Service pattern
Only all-stations "Local" services stop at this station.

Station layout
There are two main exits from the station, East and West. The East Exit is close to the main entrance to the Komaba campus of the University of Tokyo, and to the central part of Komaba. The West Exit leads to Komaba 2, 3, and 4 chōme.

The station has one island platform, serving two tracks.  Because the station is located on a slope, on the western end, toward Kichijoji, it is effectively an elevated station; the eastern end is an ordinary ground-level platform. The ticket gate at the western entrance is located on ground level, below the level of the platform, and the gate at eastern gate is located in an above-track station building, higher than the platforms.

There is an elevator between the platform and ground-level at the western entrance.

Platforms

History
The station opened on 11 July 1965.

From 22 February 2013, station numbering was introduced on Keio lines, with Komaba-tōdaimae Station becoming "IN03".

Passenger statistics
In fiscal 2013, the station was used by an average of 39,813 passengers daily.

The passenger figures for previous years are as shown below.

Surrounding area 
 University of Tokyo, Komaba Campus
 National Center for University Entrance Examinations
 Japanese Folk Crafts Museum
 Komaba Park

References

External links

 Komaba-tōdaimae Station information (Keio) 

Railway stations in Japan opened in 1965
Stations of Keio Corporation
Keio Inokashira Line
Railway stations in Tokyo
Buildings and structures in Meguro